Ripley Township may refer to:

Illinois
 Ripley Township, Brown County, Illinois

Indiana
 Ripley Township, Montgomery County, Indiana
 Ripley Township, Rush County, Indiana

Iowa
 Ripley Township, Butler County, Iowa

Minnesota
 Ripley Township, Dodge County, Minnesota
 Ripley Township, Morrison County, Minnesota

Ohio
 Ripley Township, Holmes County, Ohio
 Ripley Township, Huron County, Ohio

Township name disambiguation pages